Dhundhara is a village located in the Jodhpur district of Rajasthan in northern India. According to the 2011 Census of India, Dhundhara is a Gram Panchayat. It is at the lowest level of Panchayat Raj institutions (PRIs).

Demographics

According to the 2011 census, the population is 6019, with 1026 households. Women account for 47.9% of the population. The overall literacy rate is 56.4%, with literacy among women at 20.6%.

Transport 

The nearest access to rail transport from the region is from the Dundara and Miyan Ka Bara Halt railway stations. Until 2007, these were connected via a break of gauge junction station to the broad gauge lines going to Barmer and Jodhpur.

References 

Villages in Jodhpur district